Ti is an unincorporated community in Pittsburg County, Oklahoma, United States.

The community's name is a reversed acronym of Indian Territory.

See also
 List of geographic names derived from anagrams and ananyms

References

Unincorporated communities in Pittsburg County, Oklahoma
Unincorporated communities in Oklahoma